Hella is a small town in southern Iceland on the shores of the river Ytri-Rangá and has, as of 2021, 942 inhabitants.

Overview
The name of the town comes from caves near the river. It is said that Irish monks lived there in the times of first settlement. There are small industries as well as shops. As in other regions of the country, tourism is a growing sector. The volcano Hekla is nearby so it is possible to go hiking there as well as to make excursions to other locations popular with tourists such as Landmannalaugar or Þórsmörk. The founding of Hella started in 1927 when Þorsteinn Björnsson built a store over by the bridge Ytri-Rangá in the land of Gaddstaðaflatir. That founder of Hella was built a memorial at the celebration of Hella's 50 years since the founding of it at 1977.

See also
List of cities in Iceland
Rangárþing ytra
Hekla
Þykkvibær

References

Populated places in Southern Region (Iceland)
Populated places established in 1927